Petr Korda defeated Marcelo Ríos in the final, 6–2, 6–2, 6–2 to win the men's singles tennis title at the 1998 Australian Open. It was Korda's only major title, and Ríos' only major final.

Pete Sampras was the defending champion, but lost to Karol Kučera in the quarterfinals.

No American men made the semifinals for the first time since 1990.

Seeds

Qualifying

Draw

Finals

Top half

Section 1

Section 2

Section 3

Section 4

Bottom half

Section 5

Section 6

Section 7

Section 8

External links
 Association of Tennis Professionals (ATP) – 1998 Australian Open Men's Singles draw
 1998 Australian Open – Men's draws and results at the International Tennis Federation

Mens singles
Australian Open (tennis) by year – Men's singles